C.L.I.F. (Courage, Loyalty, Integrity, Fairness, or 警徽天职, commonly pronounced as cliff) is a police procedural series produced by Mediacorp Singapore in 2011 in collaboration with the Singapore Police Force. It was aired from 31 May to 27 June 2011 on free-to-air MediaCorp Channel 8 and consists of 20 episodes. The drama stars Tay Ping Hui, Qi Yuwu, Elvin Ng, Joanne Peh, Chris Tong and Tracy Lee in the main roles with a large ensemble supporting cast. It was directed by Chong Liung Man, who previously directed another award-winning police procedural C.I.D., which also starred Tay and Qi in the lead roles as police officers.

This drama is also the second Mediacorp production to be filmed entirely at outdoor locations after Your Hand In Mine, and the second Mediacorp production to have no news commentaries for News Tonight during credits. It was replaced by crime-prevention tips, and they were not shown in the repeat telecast.

The drama will return on the repeat telecast timeslot at 5.30pm from 6 December 2012 to 3 January 2013. It will be pre-empted on 1 January 2013 for a New Year's Day special programme.

The third installment of the series, C.L.I.F. 3 premiered on 9 April 2014 and drew a record of 904,000 viewers on its debut episode.

Cast

Main characters

Other police officers

Other characters
May Phua 潘淑钦 as Xu Yongmei (徐咏梅), Yee Tat's wife
Benjamin Heng 王智国 as Tang Yew Cheng (唐耀成), Yew Jia's older brother
Adam Chen 詹金泉 as Lim Boon Loong (林文龙), Yee Tat's former colleague in the Security Command
Desmond Tan 陈泂江 as Xu Wenbin (徐文彬), Cheng Ling's boyfriend/fiancée

Plot
The series showcases various kinds of cases police units deal with, from complicated and sensitive cases such as illegal immigrants and hostage situations to textbook crimes such as arson, drug trafficking, rape and burglary.

The police force is tasked with handling security at the World Security Summit, which is to take place in several months. Over the weeks prior to the summit the different departments and police units at Tanglin Police Division are kept busy with their various cases while preparing for the summit.

Team B leader ASP Chong Yee Tat and his partner SSI(2) Yu Chong Nam are part of the elite Special Investigations Section in the CID. Yee Tat's work often takes him away from his wife Yongmei and their young son. Five years ago Yee Tat failed to crack a case in time and the suspect strangled his daughter before being apprehended. The girl was resuscitated but suffered irreversible brain damage. This case and the burden of having to juggle professional commitments with family life become a source of guilt for him throughout the series. ASP Zhang Cheng Ling, an officer with the Police Coast Guard, was transferred to his team and is determined to prove herself in a mostly male team and overcome Chong Nam's prejudice about her.

Meanwhile, senior investigating officer SI Tang Yew Jia has a new partner, ASP Leow Xin Yi, a temporary transfer to his team in the investigation branch. Yew Jia's seemingly cold exterior frustrates the optimistic Xin Yi. It turns out that he had joined the police force with his older brother but the duo had a falling out over differing views and he is deeply troubled by it. He is especially irked by cases involving unfilial children or adolescent offenders with no regard for authority. Xin Yi finds herself emotionally affected by some of her cases and begins to question her values and principles.

Kampong Java NPCO Sgt Teo Kwee Xiang is well known for his incessant griping and complaining, which annoys his colleagues to the point where his team leader SSI Chao Kok Hung was about to have him transferred. Kwee Xiang is regularly partnered with rookie CPL Han Xiao Yang when on patrol. The duo began their working relationship badly due to their different temperaments and backgrounds. Xiao Yang, whose goal is to join the CID, comes from a wealthy family and is frustrated by Kwee Xiang's seemingly lack of ambition and commitment while Kwee Xiang frequently berates her for being too naive. She soon realises that beneath his aloofness and negativity is a kind heart and strong commitment to the job. Kwee Xiang softens his approach when he realises that Xiao Yang had joined the police force to escape her parents' iron hand but had come to love it. He also takes Sgt Koh Wen Xiong under his wing and the trio become close friends.

The police force is tested when they lose one of their own. Wen Xiong was killed in the line of duty by a mentally unstable and violent suspect. While pursuing the suspect Kwee Xiang was forced to open fire for the first time, killing the man. The team is deeply affected and Kwee Xiang, in particular, and Kok Hung deal with feelings of guilt. As the summit draws ever closer, preparations are again thwarted when Xin Yi becomes "collateral damage" while investigating a seemingly mundane kidnapping and burglary case and is held hostage by a mysterious Korean-American man. Her colleagues soon find themselves dealing with a complicated web of firearms trafficking and cover-ups involving an Interpol-listed criminal syndicate.

In the epilogue (with a one-year time lapse), it is revealed that Kwee Xiang has been promoted to staff sergeant and deputy team leader, Xiao Yang earned a transfer to the investigation branch and became Yew Jia's new partner; she and Kwee Xiang are now an item. Xin Yi finished her term and has returned to frontline duty at the NPC. Cheng Ling's boyfriend proposed to her and she accepted. Yee Tat and his wife have reached a compromise and are reconciled.

Production
In order to inject realism, the main actors were put through a crash training course on police work and procedures conducted by the Training Command (TRACOM) at the Home Team Academy. Scenes were mostly filmed on location outdoors in various parts of Singapore and police establishments such as Tanglin Police Divisional HQ and Police Cantonment Complex. Police units featured include the Criminal Investigation Department (CID), Police Coast Guard, Security Command and Special Operations Command specialist units including Police Tactical Unit (PTU), Special Tactics and Rescue (STAR), K-9 unit, Gurkha Contingent (GC) and Crisis Negotiation Unit.

Episodes

Awards and nominations
C.L.I.F. 警徽天职 was the 2nd most watched drama for 2011 with an average viewership of 924,000. The final episode attracted over 1,041,000 viewers. It also had 47,844 streams per episode, the highest average number of streams per episode on MediaCorp's Catch-Up TV portal on Xinmsn.

The series was also praised for the departure away from an idealised depiction of police officers and its more realistic portrayal of the unseen struggles and obstacles police officers and their families often face. In the past, most MediaCorp police procedurals were mostly focused on the action or comedy. In response, MediaCorp commissioned a second season, again in collaboration with the SPF, and filming began at the end of September. Most of the main cast is retained. Prior to filming, it was confirmed that Tay Ping Hui and Tracy Lee would not be returning and Rui En, Pierre Png and Li Nanxing portrayed new characters. C.L.I.F. 2 debuted in February 2013. The other dramas nominated for Best Drama Series are A Song to Remember, Kampong Ties, Secrets of Sale, and On The Fringe.

Star Awards 2012
The show garnered a string of nominations at the 2012 Star Awards in both the acting and professional categories.

Overseas broadcast

See also
 When Duty Calls

References

External links
 Official MediaCorp website
 CLIF on Singapore Police Facebook
 Catchup TV to watch all 20 episodes online

Singapore Chinese dramas
2011 Singaporean television series debuts
2011 Singaporean television series endings
Singapore Police Force
Police procedural television series
Singaporean crime television series
2011 Singaporean television seasons
Channel 8 (Singapore) original programming
C.L.I.F.